Unifi (stylized as unifi) is a service by Telekom Malaysia, offering Internet access, VoIP and IPTV to residential and business customers in Malaysia through an optical fiber network via Fiber to the Home (FTTH) for individual housing units and VDSL2 for high-rise buildings.

Formerly called the VIP (Voice, Internet, Phone) plan, the residential package was renamed as Advance plan, Pro plan, and Lite plan, which provides video or IP Television, Internet Access, and
phone service.

References 

2010 establishments in Malaysia
TM Group of Companies
Internet service providers of Malaysia